Bart Hopkin is a builder of experimental musical instruments and a writer and publisher on the subject. Hopkin runs the website windworld.com, which provides resources regarding unusual instruments.

Hopkin published the magazine Experimental Musical Instruments for 15 years and published several books and CDs specialized in a specialisation of certain types of instruments, such as wind chimes, plosive aerophones and marimbas. For these publications, Hopkin regularly asks experts on the subject to co-write the books, such as Carl Dean for the book about how to build and tune marimbas. Getting a Bigger Sound is a book Bart Hopkin wrote with Robert Cain and Jason Lollar about amplification of sound sources with several types of pickups ranging from piezo disc pickups to common pickups often used in electric guitars. Jason Lollar is a known builder of hand-wound electro-magnetic pickups.

Besides writing, he has also built several experimental musical instruments such as wooden saxophones, the Bell Tree, harmonic zithers, the Savart Wheel, the Trillium Harp, the Trillium Cluster, and many other instruments that are difficult to categorize.

In 2012, he published the book Nice Noise, about prepared guitar techniques written by Hopkin and experimental builder Yuri Landman. The book also features contributions by other builders such as Bradford Reed, Sam Dook (guitarist of The Go! Team), Fred Carlson, David Canwright, Dante Rosati and Neil Feather as well as info about John Schneiders microtonal guitars. The book was simultaneously released with 60 sound samples on bandcamp and SoundCloud.

Publications
Experimental Musical Instruments, magazine, 70 issues appeared as a printed publication between 1985 and 1999, later on re-issued as well on CD-ROM

Books
Musical Instrument Design, 1996, See Sharp Press
Gravikords, Whirlies and Pyrophones. Book & CD, Orange, Connecticut: Ellipsis Arts. #3530, 1998
Making Musical Instruments with Kids, See Sharp Press
Slap Tubes and other plosive Aerophones – Bart Hopkin and Philip Dadson, Experimental Musical Instruments
Getting a Bigger Sound – Bart Hopkin with Robert Cain and Jason Lollar
Making Marimbas and Other Bar Percussion Instruments – Bart Hopkin and Carl Dean with Christopher Banta
Wind Chimes, Design and Construction, Experimental Musical Instruments
Funny Noises for the Connoisseur, Book and audio CD – Bart Hopkin with Ray Brunelle and Vincent Nicastro
Air Columns and Tone Holes: Principles for Wind, Experimental Musical Instruments
Nice Noise – Bart Hopkin and Yuri Landman, 72 pgs, Full Color, 2012, Experimental Musical Instruments,

CDs
 INSTUMENTARIUM HOPKINIS, Bart Hopkin Plays Invented Instruments, 2002
 AFTER SEVEN YEARS, Guitar Music from Bart Hopkin, 2003
 BOSSAS, BALLADS, AND BLUES, Dale Polissar, clarinet, and Bart Hopkin, guitar, 2004
 21 WAYS OF LOOKING AT THINGS, Sound Instruments Designed by Bart Hopkin, 2007
 MELANGE, Dale Polissar, clarinet, and Bart Hopkin, guitar, 2009

See also
 Harry Partch, American pioneer on experimental lutherie
 Nicolas Collins, another author with a focus on somewhat identical topics

References

 interview with Hopkin by New Music Box, a website from the American Music Center
 blog.makezine.com/archive/2011/10/the-musical-invention-of-bart-hopkin

External links
 Bart Hopkin's website
 Experimental Musical Instruments website
 Experimental Musical Instruments website, Bart Hopkin's pages
 Mentioned in passing as one of the first of "Fr. Ho Lung and friends"

American musical instrument makers
American writers about music
Living people
Year of birth missing (living people)
Inventors of musical instruments